Clear Lake is a lake in Minnehaha County, South Dakota, in the United States.

Clear Lake was descriptively named on account of its clear water.

See also
List of lakes in South Dakota

References

Lakes of South Dakota
Lakes of Minnehaha County, South Dakota